On 3 January 2001, a suicide attack was carried out by Revolutionary People's Liberation Party/Front member Gültekin Koç in Şişli, Istanbul, at a police station. As a result of the explosion, one civilian along with the perpetrator was killed and 7 others were injured, 2 being critically.

Attack 
At around 13:50 (UTC+02.00), Revolutionary People's Liberation Party/Front member Gültekin Koç introduced himself as a business man and entered a police station. He went to the room of Şişli District Chief Constable Selçuk Tanrıverdi using an elevator. Bodyguard of Tanrıverdi, Naci Canan Tuncer realized him and asked him why he wants to see Tanrıverdi. Koç panicked and detonated the explosives on him. Naci Canan Tuncer and perperator Gültekin Koç died in the attack while seven people including three police officers and 4 civilians were injured.

References 

Suicide bombings in 2001
2000s in Istanbul
Suicide bombings in Istanbul
2001 murders in Turkey
January 2001 events in Turkey
January 2001 crimes
DHKP/C attacks
Şişli